The dark stonebasher (Pollimyrus nigricans) is a species of ray-finned fish in the family Mormyridae.

Location
It is found in Burundi, Kenya, Tanzania, and Uganda. In Africa, they can be found at Lake Victoria, Nabugabo and Kyoga; the Kiruni River (Semliki Valley), Malagarasi River and Tanganyika Lake.

Biology
Its natural habitats are rivers, swamps, freshwater lakes, freshwater marshes, and inland deltas. It can be found in tropical climates. They are also known to swim up the river to spawn. The Dark stonebasher also prefers the shallow muddy bottom of waters near vegetation.

Feeding
The dark stonebasher mainly feeds on Caridina and caenid larvae.

Threats
It is threatened by habitat loss.

References

Notes

Mormyridae
Taxonomy articles created by Polbot
Fish described in 1906